Matheus Gonçalves Martins (born 18 August 2005) is a Brazilian footballer who plays as a midfielder for Flamengo.

Club career
Matheus Gonçalves signed for Flamengo at the age of twelve, progressing through the youth ranks and signing his first professional contract in August 2021.

In September 2022, he was named by English newspaper The Guardian as one of the best players born in 2005 worldwide.

Career statistics

Club

References

2005 births
Living people
Brazilian footballers
Association football midfielders
Campeonato Brasileiro Série A players
CR Flamengo footballers